Zeta Corse was a Russian motor racing team, who formerly operated in the Formula Renault 3.5 Series.

History

In January 2013, was announced that Giancarlo Zampieri (father of Daniel Zampieri) bought BVM - Target Racing Formula Renault 3.5 Series subdivision. The team was renamed to Zeta Corse, headed by Claudio Corradini and used personnel that previously worked with EPIC Racing and HRT F1 Team. The team headquarters was changed to Valencia.

For their first Formula Renault 3.5 Series round at Monza they signed Mihai Marinescu and Emmanuel Piget. But Piget raced just one round, in Alcañiz he was replaced by FIA Formula Two Championship runner-up Mathéo Tuscher. In Monaco the squad decided to completely change their line-up to Carlos Sainz Jr. and Nick Yelloly. Marinescu returned to the team for Spa and Moscow rounds, while Sainz was replaced by William Buller. At Spielberg Marinescu's seat was occupied by Riccardo Agostini, who handed back that seat to Sainz.  On 14 December 2013 was revealed that the team was taken over by the Russian RMD Media company.  The best achievement for Zeta Corse drivers in 2013 was three Buller's finishes in the top-five.

In 2014, the team had two full-time drivers after signing Roman Mavlanov and Roberto Merhi for their debut season in Formula Renault 3.5. Merhi started the season with the first podium for the team, finishing as runner-up to Will Stevens in the first race at Monza. On the home soil for the team at Moscow, Merhi took the first win for Zeta Corse. Merhi also achieved wins at Nürburgring and Hungaroring, finishing third in the drivers' standings and bringing the team the fourth in the teams' standings.

For 2015, the team decided to sign former GP2 Series driver Facu Regalia. However the Argentine driver since moved to Comtec Racing, and then to the Auto GP World Series, with Zeta Corse participating in no further races.

Results

In 2013 the team competed under Italian racing license, since 2014 the team racing under Russian racing license.

References

External links
 

Russian auto racing teams
Auto racing teams established in 2013
2013 establishments in the Valencian Community
World Series Formula V8 3.5 teams
Auto racing teams disestablished in 2015